Ronald ("Ron") Ferdinand Zwerver (born 6 June 1967) is a retired volleyball player from the Netherlands, who represented his native country in three consecutive Summer Olympics, starting in 1988 in Seoul, South Korea. He was one of the dominant forces in Dutch volleyball in the 1990s.

Zwerver was a member of the teams which won the silver medal in the 1992 Summer Olympics and the gold medal in the 1996 Summer Olympics. He is the current coach of Nesselande, which is a team that plays in the highest Dutch league.

Individual awards
 1990 FIVB World League "Best Spiker"
 1991 FIVB World League "Best Server"
 1991 FIVB World League "Best Spiker"
 1994 FIVB Volleyball Men's World Championship "Best Spiker"

References

1967 births
Living people
Dutch men's volleyball players
Dutch volleyball coaches
Volleyball players at the 1988 Summer Olympics
Volleyball players at the 1992 Summer Olympics
Volleyball players at the 1996 Summer Olympics
Olympic volleyball players of the Netherlands
Olympic gold medalists for the Netherlands
Olympic silver medalists for the Netherlands
Olympic medalists in volleyball
Sportspeople from Amsterdam
People from Heiloo

Medalists at the 1996 Summer Olympics
Medalists at the 1992 Summer Olympics
20th-century Dutch people
21st-century Dutch people